Victor Negara (born 14 July 1991) is a Moldovan footballer who plays as a defender for Moldovan club Spartanii Selemet.

References

1991 births
Living people
Moldovan footballers
Footballers from Chișinău
Association football defenders
Speranța Nisporeni players
FC Victoria Bardar players
FC Dinamo-Auto Tiraspol players
CSF Bălți players
Moldovan Super Liga players